In cryptography, Zodiac is a block cipher designed in 2000 by Chang-Hyi Lee for the Korean firm SoftForum.

Zodiac uses a 16-round Feistel network structure with key whitening. The round function uses only XORs and S-box lookups. There are two 8×8-bit S-boxes: one based on the discrete exponentiation 45x as in SAFER, the other using the multiplicative inverse in the finite field GF(28), as introduced by SHARK.

Zodiac is theoretically vulnerable to impossible differential cryptanalysis, which can recover a 128-bit key in 2119 encryptions.

References

Further reading 
 
 

Broken block ciphers
Feistel ciphers